SDMA may refer to:

 Symmetric dimethylarginine, an exogenous isomer of asymmetric dimethylarginine (ADMA) that is used as a renal function tracer/biomarker to diagnose chronic kidney disease
 Space-division multiple access, a channel access method used in communication (for instance in MIMO technology)
 Soft direct memory access, a type of direct memory access (DMA) specific to Xilinx's Multi-Port Memory Controller (MPMC)
 System direct memory access, a Linux kernel module and userspace library for accessing direct memory access (DMA) using some processors made by Texas Instruments
 Standard database management analysis